Mondou is a surname. Notable people with the surname include:

Albéric-Archie Mondou (1872–1951), Canadian politician
Armand Mondou (1905–1976), Canadian ice hockey forward
Benoît Mondou (born 1985), Canadian ice hockey player
Nate Mondou (born 1995), American baseball player
Pierre Mondou (born 1955), Canadian ice hockey forward